Persephone is an Ancient Greek name used in reference to Persephone, the Greek goddess of spring and the Greek underworld.

Diminutives in use include Effie, Perci, Percy, Persi, Persie, Persy, Sephie or Sephy.

Popularity
Usage of the name has increased in recent years. Parents might have been influenced by the popularity of names associated with the natural world or by other long, similar sounding Greek names such as Penelope. Names from Greek mythology and names with positive associations also gained popularity for babies born during the COVID-19 pandemic. It has been among the one thousand most popular names for newborn girls in the United States since 2019.

Notable people
 Persephone Borrow, English immunologist
 Persephone Swales-Dawson (born 1997), British television actress

Fictional characters
 Persephone (The Matrix), a fictional character in the Matrix film trilogy
 Persephone or Rachel Blake, a character in The Lost Experience
 Persephone, a character in Jeff Noon's novel Pollen
 Persephone, a character in Stripperella
 Persephone, the Goddess of Life in the computer game Sacrifice
 Persephone, a character in Herc's Adventures
 Persephone "Sephy" Hadley, main character in the Noughts & Crosses series of novels by Malorie Blackman
 Persephone, an Amazon in Wonder Woman (film)
 Persephone, the daughter of Admiral Lockwood, and object of Commander Kydd's affections, in the book The Admiral's Daughter
 Persephone, a Fairy character who sells upgrades in the Activision computer game Skylanders: Spyro's Adventure (game)
 Persephone "Persie" Towyn, sister of Lady Agnes Holland in the BBC TV Series Upstairs Downstairs
 Persephone, a nickname of Eo of Lykos from Red Rising by Pierce Brown.

Notes